Mesostoma is a genus of Typhloplanidae.

The genus was described in 1837 by Christian Gottfried Ehrenberg.

Synonym: Schizostomum Schmidt, 1848 (nomen oblitum).

Species:
 Mesostoma ehrenbergii
 Mesostoma tetragonum

References

External links

Rhabdocoela
Platyhelminthes genera
Taxa named by Christian Gottfried Ehrenberg